Ireland rugby team may refer to teams in the different codes of rugby football:

Rugby union
 Ireland national rugby union team, administered by the Irish Rugby Football Union.
Ireland women's national rugby union team, administered by the Irish Rugby Football Union.
 Ireland national rugby sevens team compete in the HSBC World Sevens Series
Ireland women's national rugby sevens team compete in the Women's Sevens Series

Rugby league
 Ireland national rugby league team, administered by the Rugby League Ireland.